"One Beat at a Time" is a song recorded by Canadian country music artist Jim Witter. It was released in 2000 as the fourth single from his second studio album, All My Life. It peaked at number 7 on the RPM Country Tracks chart in September 2000.

The song was also recorded by Steve Holy on his 2000 debut album, Blue Moon.

Chart performance

References

1999 songs
2000 singles
Jim Witter songs
Curb Records singles
Songs written by Jamie O'Hara (singer)
Songs written by James House (singer)
Steve Holy songs